Serhiy Frolov (born 14 April 1992 in Zaporizhia, Ukraine) is a Ukrainian swimmer.

Career
He has won several international juniors medals in his career and a silver medal at the 1500 meter freestyle during the 2010 European Short Course Swimming Championships. At the 2012 Summer Olympics, he competed in the Men's 400 metre freestyle, finishing in 17th place in the heats, failing to reach the final.

References

External links
 

1992 births
Living people
Sportspeople from Zaporizhzhia
Olympic swimmers of Ukraine
Swimmers at the 2012 Summer Olympics
Swimmers at the 2016 Summer Olympics
Ukrainian male freestyle swimmers
European Aquatics Championships medalists in swimming
Universiade medalists in swimming
Universiade gold medalists for Ukraine
Universiade silver medalists for Ukraine
Medalists at the 2011 Summer Universiade
Medalists at the 2013 Summer Universiade
Medalists at the 2015 Summer Universiade
Medalists at the 2017 Summer Universiade
Swimmers at the 2020 Summer Olympics
21st-century Ukrainian people